Aleksandar Borisov Stankov (born 3 September 1964) is a Bulgarian football manager and a former footballer, who is currently manager.

Managerial career 
In 2005, he worked with  the second team of Krylia Sovetov in Russia. On 12 June 2010, Stankov agreed to join Chinese side Dalian Aerbin as manager, signing a one-and-a-half-year contract. He guided Dalian to the Chinese Super League, but was released by the club in January 2011 when his contract expired.

On 15 June 2013, Stankov was officially appointed as the Lokomotiv Plovdiv manager.

On 16 May 2017, Meizhou Hakka F.C. signed Stankov as their manager.

References

1964 births
Living people
Bulgarian footballers
Bulgarian football managers
PFC CSKA Sofia managers
Bulgarian expatriate football managers
Expatriate football managers in Russia
PFC Lokomotiv Plovdiv managers
Expatriate football managers in China
PFC Cherno More Varna managers
Hunan Billows F.C. managers
Footballers from Sofia
Association football midfielders
Meizhou Hakka F.C. managers